FEDCO may refer to:
 Federal Employees' Distributing Company, Fedco.
 Fluid Equipment Development Company, FEDCO.
 Fedco Seeds, Inc.
 Fedco brand batter mixers, part of The Peerless Group.
 Fedco Electronics, Inc.